Apostictopterus is a genus of skippers in the family Hesperiidae. It contains only one species, Apostictopterus fuliginosus, which is found in India (Assam) and West China.

Subspecies
Apostictopterus fuliginosus fuliginosus
Apostictopterus fuliginosus curiosa (Swinhoe, 1917) (Assam)

References

External links
Natural History Museum Lepidoptera genus database

Erionotini
Butterflies of Indochina
Monotypic butterfly genera
Hesperiidae genera
Butterflies described in 1893